Carlos Edgardo García Portela (November 18, 1921 in Vega Baja, Puerto Rico – January 2, 2011) was a Puerto Rican lawyer, politician and former senator. 

He was a member of the Senate of Puerto Rico from 1965 to 1969 representing the Popular Democratic Party (PPD).

Carlos García Portela was born on November 18, 1921 in Vega Baja, Puerto Rico. 
He was the son of dentist and politician Carlos García del Rosario and Amparo Portela Pérez.

García Portela was elected to the Senate of Puerto Rico, representing the District of San Juan, at the 1964 general elections. He served in that position until 1968.

García Portela was married to Carmen Irene Goyco Monagas.
 
They had four children together: Carlos, Osvaldo, Carenín and Edgardo. 

He died on January 2, 2011, at the age of 89. He was buried at Buxeda Memorial Park in San Juan, Puerto Rico.

References

1921 births
2011 deaths
People from Vega Baja, Puerto Rico
Members of the Senate of Puerto Rico
Popular Democratic Party (Puerto Rico) politicians
Puerto Rican Roman Catholics